McKinnie is a surname. Notable people with the surname include:

Alfonzo McKinnie (born 1992), American basketball player
Bryant McKinnie (born 1979), American football player
Burt McKinnie (1879–1946), American golfer
Eric "Ricky" McKinnie (born 1952), American musician
Miriam McKinnie (1906–1987), American artist

See also

McKinney (surname)

Kinnie (disambiguation)
McKinney (disambiguation)